The Isle of Conquest is a 1919 American silent drama film starring Norma Talmadge and produced by Talmadge and her husband Joseph Schenck. The film is now considered lost.

Plot
Based upon a short review in a film magazine, a young woman (Talmadge) marries a wealthy scoundrel so that her mother can live in luxury. While vacationing on his yacht, she becomes shipwrecked and is cast on a desert island with a stoker (Standing) for her companion. They eventually fall in love, but are rescued just before celebrating their wilderness-witnessed nuptials. Her husband later dies, so the lovers are then able to marry.

Cast
 Norma Talmadge as Ethel Harmon
 Wyndham Standing as John Arnold
 Charles K. Gerrard as Van Surdam
 Hedda Hopper as Mrs. Harmon
 Natalie Talmadge as Janis Harmon
 Claire Whitney as Claire Wilson
 Gareth Hughes as Jack Frazier
 Joseph W. Smiley as Dr. Chase
 William Bailey
 Merceita Esmond

See also
List of lost films

References

External links

 
 
Still of director Edward Jose, the Talmadge sisters and Hedda Hopper during production

1919 films
1919 drama films
Silent American drama films
American silent feature films
American black-and-white films
Films based on American novels
Films shot in Florida
American independent films
Lost American films
Films with screenplays by Anita Loos
Films directed by Edward José
Selznick Pictures films
Lost drama films
1919 lost films
1910s independent films
1910s American films